Noeggerathiales is a now-extinct order of vascular plants. The fossil range of the order extends from the Upper Carboniferous to the upper Permian (Lopingian). Due to gaps in the fossil record, the group is incompletely known and poorly defined, and their taxonomic status and position in the plant kingdom are uncertain.  The Noeggerathiales have been proposed in the evolutionary scheme in two remotely related groups of vascular plants, the Pteropsida and the Sphenopsida.

Noeggerathiales have been previously linked to horsetails and ferns, but are currently believed to be progymnosperms.

Noeggerathiales had a tree fern like appearance, with leaves sprouting from the top of an unbranched trunk. They were primarily confined to the wet tropical regions where there was no frost. Noeggerathiales are rare in European and North American floras, but are common components of Cathaysian Chinese floras.

One form, Paratingia wuhaia, resembled a small fern reaching from two to several meters in height.

References

External links 
 The Taxonomicon
 300-Million-Year-Old Forest Discovered Preserved in Volcanic Ash

Prehistoric plant orders
Carboniferous plants
Permian plants